Li Guoping (November 15, 1910 – February 8, 1996) was a Chinese mathematician. He was a member of the Chinese Academy of Sciences.

References 

1910 births
1996 deaths
Members of the Chinese Academy of Sciences